Adam Mitzner (born 1964) is an American writer of legal thrillers and a practicing attorney. His books have been critically acclaimed for their realistic portrayal of the law as well as for their twists and turns.

Early life and education

Mitzner was born in Brooklyn, New York, and grew up in East Brunswick, New Jersey. He is a 1982 graduate of East Brunswick High School, where he served as student council president.

Mitzner attended Brandeis University, where he received a B.A. and M.A. (Politics). He graduated from the University of Virginia School of Law in 1989.

Career

A Conflict of Interest was published in 2011 and was named one of Suspense Magazine's Best Book of the Year. It reached #1 on Audible on January 30, 2012.

A Case of Redemption was published in 2013, and was the only literature nominee of the American Bar Association's Silver Gavel Award.

Losing Faith was published in April 2015.

The Girl From Home was published in April 2016.

In 2016, Mitzner switched publishers, signing a two-book deal with Thomas & Mercer. His first Thomas & Mercer book, Dead Certain, was published in June 2017. Dead Certain was a #1 Kindle best-seller and was on Amazon charts for seven straight weeks.

On June 25, 2019, Mitzner published A Matter of Will.

On April 14, 2020, Mitzner published The Best Friend, the third book in the Broden Legal series. Booklist wrote: "This is a well-constructed, compelling legal thriller that deals perceptively with guilt and retribution, all set on a firm basis of love."

Bibliography

The Best Friend (April 2020) published by Thomas & Mercer. 
A Matter of Will (June 2019) published by Thomas & Mercer. 
Never Goodbye ((April 2018)) published by Thomas & Mercer. 
Dead Certain: A Novel (June 2017) published by Thomas & Mercer. 
The Girl From Home: A Thriller (April 2016) published by Gallery Books. 
Losing Faith (April 2015) published by  Gallery Books. 
A Case of Redemption (May 2013) published by Pocket Books. 
A Conflict of Interest (May 2011) published by Gallery Books.

References 

Living people
1964 births
21st-century American novelists
American male novelists
American thriller writers
Brandeis University alumni
East Brunswick High School alumni
New Jersey lawyers
Novelists from New Jersey
People from East Brunswick, New Jersey
University of Virginia School of Law alumni
21st-century American male writers